"Tres Deseos" (in English: Three Wishes) is a merengue and salsa song by Cuban American singer-songwriter Gloria Estefan, released in 1996 as a promotional single from her second Spanish-language album, Abriendo Puertas (1995). An upbeat Latin dance song, it was the first promotional single released worldwide from the album. In Japan, it was released as a CD maxi single. Remixes of the song were produced by Rosabel, and with their help the song successfully made it to number one on the US Billboard Hot Dance Music/Club Play chart. It become popular at Estefan's concerts as a medley with her song, Higher from the  album Destiny.

Critical reception
Larry Flick from Billboard wrote, "Latest offering from La Gloria's oh-so-fab Abriendo Puertas opus features the singer gingerly vamping and chanting over a percolating Latin-house groove. Club DJs are given a wealth of fine remixes to choose from, ranging from Ralphi Rosario and Abel Aguilera's stompin' tribal-house versions to Pablo Flores and Javier Garza's more traditional tropical mixes. Regardless of your choice, you get an ample dose of Estefan's loose, fun performance and a tune built on a tightly constructed melody. Simply put, ya can't lose with this one!" 

Chuck Campbell from Knoxville News Sentinel remarked the "hyper-complex melody lines" of "Tres Deseos". Pan-European magazine Music & Media described it as "one of the more 'latin' tracks" of the Abriendo Puertas album, "which has Estefan exploring her origins, while not forgetting her international pop status." They added further that "Tres Deseos" "is 100 percent pure undiluted salsa, just like the extra track, a traditional son called 'Farolito'. It's sheer pleasure to hear Estefan indulge herself in her Cuban roots." Gerald Martinez from New Sunday Times viewed it as "lively merengue", noting that the song features "wonderfully complex horn parts, driving percussion and engaging vocals."

Usage in media
In 1998, the song was featured on the soundtrack for the film Dance with Me, which also featured Estefan's single Heaven's What I Feel.

In the seventh season of the American television program Dancing with the Stars; actress Cloris Leachman used the song on the fifth night of the competition.

Formats and track listings
These are the formats and track listings of major single releases of Tres Deseos.

 US CD 12" Vinyl Single (EAS 7798)
 "Tres Deseos" (Album Version) (03:32)
 "Tres Deseos" (Pablo Flores 12" Mix) (06:35)
 "Tres Deseos" (Rosabel's Fiesta Mix) (07:29)
 "Tres Deseos" (Rosabel's Percapella Beats) (05:45)
 "Tres Deseos" (Rosabel's The Three Wish Dub) (07:15)
 "Tres Deseos" (Rosabel's Tribe Dub) (07:57)
 "Tres Deseos" (Rosabel's The Under Dub) (05:30)
 "Tres Deseos" (Rosabel's Bonus Wish Mix) (04:06)
 "Tres Deseos" (Rosabel's Tragic Dub) (08:08)
 "Tres Deseos" (Rosabel's The More Tragic Dub) (08:15)

Official versions
Original versions
 Album version — 3:32

Pablo Flores & Javier Garza Remixes
 12" Remix - 6:41
 12" Remix Edit — 5:00

Rosabel (Ralphi Rosario & Abel Aguilera) Remixes
 Rosabel's Fiesta Mix — 7:29
 Rosabel's Tragic Dub — 8:08
 Rosabel's The Three Wish Dub — 7:15
 Rosabel's Tribe Dub — 7:57
 Rosabel's The More Tragic Dub — 8:15
 Rosabel's The Under Dub — 5:30
 Rosabel's Bonus Wish Mix — 4:06
 Rosabel's Percapella Beats — 5:45

Release history

Charts

References

External links
Lyrics with English translation

1996 singles
Gloria Estefan songs
Spanish-language songs
Songs written by Kike Santander
1995 songs
Epic Records singles